Morney Plains Station, most commonly referred to as Morney Plains, is a pastoral lease that operates as a cattle station in south west Queensland.

History
The traditional owners of the area are the Karuwali, who have lived there for tens of thousands of years. 

Karuwali (also known as Garuwali, Dieri) is a language of far western Queensland. The Karuwali language region includes the landscape within the local government boundaries of the Diamantina Shire Council, including the localities of Betoota and Haddon Corner.

The lease was first taken up, on Karuwali tribal lands, by pioneer and pastoralist John Costello in the late 1860s or early 1870s. William Barker bought Morney Plains in 1876 along with the 1,000 head of cattle it was stocked with from the Collins brothers.

The property was owned by Weir and Scott in 1881 when it was visited by a journalist who described it as "splendid country with hardly any grass on it simply to want for sufficient rainfall". The writer had been riding in a southerly direction along the Diamantina River and had described the area near the station as being lightly timbered stony country with large areas of saltbush and cotton bush. In 1887 the homestead was washed away following exceptionally heavy rains in the area and the heaviest flooding known at the time.

In 1927 the property was acquired by Ernest Castine for £27,500. Castine bought the property at auction from Coles Brothers Limited following the death of Thomas Kidman.
 
Airmail delivery to remote properties in outback South Australia, New South Wales and Queensland commenced in 1949. Morney Plains along with other remote properties including Mungerannie, Clifton Hills, Glengyle, Davenport Downs, Mulka, Mount Leonard, Durrie, Cordillo Downs, Tanbar Station, Durham Downs, Nappa Merrie, Lake Pure and Naryilco were also on the route.

Craig Lasker and Nikki Smith have managed the property since 2000 after short stints at Ruby Plains Station and then Mooraberree Station, an outstation at Morney Plains. Drought struck in 2001 and continued through 2002, with the herd being reduced from 13,000 to 3,000 head of cattle. In 2003 a heavy downpour caused more damage than relief and later the same year the homestead burnt down killing the couple's two children. Despite the tragedy the couple stayed at Morney Plains and were still managing it in 2012.
 
In 2013, the station was struck by drought again, requiring water to be piped from a bore to the homestead once the water in the dams had run dry.

See also
List of ranches and stations
List of the largest stations in Australia

References

Stations (Australian agriculture)
Pastoral leases in Queensland
South West Queensland